Pandalam is a municipal town in Pathanamthitta district Kerala, India. Pandalam is known for its connection with  Ayyappan and Sabarimala. Rightly recognised to be the educational and cultural capital of Central Travancore, Pandalam hosts educational institutions ranging from reputed schools to post graduate, training, Ayurveda, and engineering colleges. There are seven colleges and 23 schools at Pandalam, including N. S. S. College, Pandalam. The Kerala state government plans to make the place a special Township, by including the Pandalam municipality and Kulanada panchayat.

The neighborhoods of Pandalam town include Thumpamon, Pandalam Thekkekara (Adoor Taluk), Kulanada (Kozhencherry Taluk), Nooranad, Padanilam (Mavelikkara Taluk), Venmony (Chengannur Taluk).It Is Located 23 km From Thiruvalla City Centre.

Trade and Commerce
The centuries-old Kurunthottayam market (now known as the Pandalam market) was one among the largest agricultural markets in central Travancore.

Kerala's widest suspension bridge was constructed in Pandalam over the Achankovil river. The bridge is 70 metres long and 2.5 metres wide.

There are several devotional places at Pandalam. The most famous are Valiyakoikkal Temple, Mahadeva Temple, Puthenkavil Bhagavathi Temple, Pattupurakkavu Bhagavathi Temple, Thumpamon Vadakkumnatha Temple, Kadakkad Sree Bhadrakali Temple and the  Thattayil Orippurathu Bhagavathi Temple.

Nooranad Padanilam Parabrahma Temple, which is famous for its Maha Shivaratri Kettukazhcha is located 8 Km South West of Pandalam town.

Legend

According to legend, Lord Ayyappan, the presiding deity of Sabarimala, had his human sojourn at Pandalam as the adopted son of the King of Pandalam.  During Sabarimala pilgrimage season, devotees come to Pandalam in large numbers to worship the deity of Valiyakoikkal Temple near the Pandalam Palace. This temple is on the banks of river Achenkovil. Three days prior to the Makaravilakku festival, the Thiruvabharanam (sacred ornaments) are taken in a procession from Pandalam to Sabarimala.

History
It is believed that the Pandya kings of Tamil Nadu fled to Pandalam in the face of an attack from Cholas  and settled there in the land they bought from Kaipuzha Thampan, a landlord. The Pandya dynasty had provinces on either sides of the Western Ghats. The King of Pandalam helped Marthanda Varma to conquer the Kayamkulam province. In return for this help, Marthanda Varma did not attempt to attack and conquer Pandalam during the expansion of his kingdom. The princely state of Pandalam had extended up to Thodupuzha in Idukki district once. Pandalam was added to Travancore in 1820. Before the formation of Pathanamthitta district, Pandalam was in Mavelikara taluk of Alappuzha district.

Colleges
 NSS College Pandalam
 Mannam Ayurveda Co-operative Medical College, Pandalam
 NSS Polytechnic College, Pandalam
 NSS Training College, Pandalam
 NSS Nursing College, Pandalam
 Govt. ITI cherickal, Pandalam (Under SC department Govt. of Kerala)  in Cherickal.

Hospitals 

 NSS Medical Mission Hospital
 CM Hospital
 Chitra Multi-Speciality Hospital
 Mannam Ayurveda Hospital
 Primary Health Centre Kadakkad, Pandalam

Landmarks

Pandalam Bridge 
Pandalam Bridge, popularly known as Kurunthottayam Bridge, is situated in Pandalam junction.

Pandalam Suspension Bridge
Pandalam Suspension Bridge, is a pedestrian suspension bridge in Pandalam, that connects Pandalam with Kulanada.

Pandalam Palace
Pandalam Palace, placed on the banks of Achankovil river, was home to the royal family of Pandalam.The royal family of this palace enjoys a significant position in the history of Kerala. It is believed that they have descended from the Pandya kings of Madurai. Pandalam Palace carries not just historical importance, but a considerable religious magnitude as well. According to legends, Lord Ayyappa was born to the King of Pandalam.There is a temple on the banks of Achankovil river which is dedicated to Lord Ayyappa. The sacred ornaments of Lord Ayyappa are carried from Pandalam Palace to Sabarimala as a grand procession three days prior to the makaravilakku festival

Famous Personalities

Pandalam Kerala Varma: Poet
M. N. Govindan Nair: Former State Secretary of CPI, Former State Cabinet Minister and MP
V. S. Valiathan: Artist
Benyamin: Novelist
Dr. Biju: Film director
P. K. Manthri: Cartoonist
Kadammanitta Vasudevan Pillai: Padayani artist
Pandalam Sudhakaran: Former state cabinet minister
Pandalam KP Raman pillai : Poet,Journalist,freedom fighter,author of famous prayer song "Akilandamandalam aniyochorukki"

Gallery

References

External links

 Information portal about Pandalam

Cities and towns in Pathanamthitta district